Sebastian Korda was the defending champion but chose not to defend his title.

Daniel Masur won the title after defeating Maxime Cressy 6–4, 6–4 in the final.

Seeds

Draw

Finals

Top half

Bottom half

References

External links
Main draw
Qualifying draw

Challenger Eckental - 1
2021 Singles